Brian Lamont Thomson (born 1 March 1959) is a Scottish former professional footballer who played in the Football League for Mansfield Town.

References

1959 births
Living people
Scottish footballers
Association football forwards
English Football League players
Morecambe F.C. players
West Ham United F.C. players
Mansfield Town F.C. players
Corby Town F.C. players
King's Lynn F.C. players
Boston United F.C. players